This article list the monarchs (Marena) of Lesotho (also known as Basutoland until 1966).

Succession
The Succession to the throne of Lesotho is laid down in Chapter V of the African kingdom's constitution. The current King is Letsie III.

Chapter V Article 45 of Lesotho's constitution reads that:

(1) The College of Chiefs may at any time designate, in accordance with the customary law of Lesotho, the person (or the persons, in order of prior right) who are entitled to succeed to the office of King upon the death of the holder of, or the occurrence of any vacancy in, that office and if on such death or vacancy, there is a person who has previously been designated in pursuance of this section and who is capable under the customary law of Lesotho of succeeding to that office, that person (or, if there is more than one such person, that one of them who has been designated as having the first right to succeed to the office) shall become King.

(2) If, on the death of the holder of, or the occurrence of any vacancy in, the office of King, there is no person who becomes King under subsection (1), the College of Chiefs shall, with all practical speed and in accordance with the customary law of Lesotho, proceed to designate a person to succeed to the office of King and the person so designated shall thereupon become King.

Compensation
The king is granted a privy purse amounting to 52,778 USD annually.

Kings / Paramount Chiefs of Lesotho / Basutoland (1822–1966)
 Moshoeshoe I: 1822 – 18 January 1870
 Letsie I: 18 January 1870 – 20 November 1891
 Lerotholi Letsie: 20 November 1891 – 19 August 1905
 Letsie II: 21 August 1905 – 28 January 1913
 Nathaniel Griffith Lerotholi: 11 April 1913 – 23 June 1939
 Simon Seeiso Griffith: 3 August 1939 – 26 December 1940
 Gabasheane Masupha (regent): 26 December 1940 – 28 January 1941
 'Mantšebo Amelia 'Matšaba (regent): 28 January 1941 – 12 March 1960
 Moshoeshoe II: 12 March 1960 – 4 October 1966

Kings of Lesotho (1966–present)

Regent Head of State
Queen 'Mamohato: 5 June 1970 – 5 December 1970, 10 March 1990 – 12 November 1990 and 15 January 1996 – 7 February 1996

Timeline since 1960

Royal Standards

See also
 List of prime ministers of Lesotho
 Lists of office-holders

Notes

References

Lesotho

Monarchies of South Africa